SFX Drama Erexion is a South Korean children's tokusatsu drama that premiered on November 24, 2006. It is produced by Chungam Entertainment and airs on KBS 2. Its format is similar to the tokusatsu productions of Japan. The seven members are based upon the seven days of the Asian calendar (Sun, Moon, Fire, Water, Wood, Metal, Earth).

Synopsis
On the distant planet Airon, there was the Crystal tower which held "the crystals," a powerful source of energy that kept the galaxy in balance. The evil Terra however, tried to gain control of it and the brave general Kamo stopped him by destroying the tower. The crystals divided into seven and were scattered all over the Earth, and Terra was dormant due to the explosion that knocked him out. Thus Li, the high priestess of Airon, ventured off to Earth to find the seven pieces and restore balance along with her bodyguard Mok-gi and six individuals from the past, present, and future. As the Universe Seven, Il-sung, Wur-hwa, Hwa-san, Soo-shim, Toh-ryuk, Geum-gang, and Mok-gi fight against the treacherous Chu-yi and the reawakened Terra in order to prevent the crystals to falling into the wrong hands.

Cast
Choi Woo-seok as Il-seong
Jang Ji-won as Wol-hwa
Lee Geon as Hwa-san
Lee Ka-young as Su-shim
Cha Woo-jin as Mok-gi
Jeong Se-in as Keum-kang
Lee-ro Jeong as Do-ryeok
Lee Han-sol as Te-ra
Jeon-yeong
Ji Jun-seong as Chu-yi

Songs
Theme song "Light" by Paran
Insert songs
"Invisible Force" by Kim Kyo-min
"We're in this together" by Kim Kyo-min (with Kwon Dae-hun)

External links
Erexion official website 
Erexion at KBS 

Korean Broadcasting System television dramas
2006 South Korean television series debuts
Tokusatsu
Tokusatsu television series
Transforming heroes